209th may refer to:

209th (Swift Current) Battalion, CEF, a unit in the Canadian Expeditionary Force during the First World War
209th Detachment, 2325th Group, a black operation team of Republic of Korea Air Force whose task was to assassinate Kim Il-sung

See also
209 (number)
209, the year 209 (CCIX) of the Julian calendar